Kim Soo-Kyung (also Kim Su-Gyeong, ; born August 6, 1985) is a South Korean weightlifter. She won a silver medal for the 63 kg class at the 2010 Asian Games in Guangzhou, China, with a total of 240 kilograms.

Kim made her official debut for the 2004 Summer Olympics in Athens, where she competed for the women's middleweight class (63 kg). She finished only in fifth place by 2.5 kilograms short of her snatch record from Tunisia's Hayet Sassi, with a total of 215.0 kg (92.5 in the snatch, and 122.5 in the clean and jerk).

At the 2008 Summer Olympics in Beijing, Kim qualified for the second time in the women's 63 kg class, after finishing sixth from the 2007 World Weightlifting Championships in Chiang Mai, Thailand. Kim placed sixth in this event, as she successfully lifted 98 kg in the single-motion snatch, and hoisted 127 kg in the two-part, shoulder-to-overhead clean and jerk, for a total of 225 kg.

References

External links
NBC 2008 Olympics profile

South Korean female weightlifters
1985 births
Living people
Olympic weightlifters of South Korea
Weightlifters at the 2004 Summer Olympics
Weightlifters at the 2008 Summer Olympics
Asian Games medalists in weightlifting
Weightlifters at the 2006 Asian Games
Weightlifters at the 2010 Asian Games
Weightlifters at the 2014 Asian Games
Asian Games silver medalists for South Korea
Medalists at the 2010 Asian Games
Universiade medalists in weightlifting
Universiade bronze medalists for South Korea
20th-century South Korean women
21st-century South Korean women